Sceptre (K-17) was the unsuccessful challenger of the 1958 America's Cup for the Royal Yacht Squadron.

Design
Designed by David Boyd and built by Alexander Robertson & Sons, Sceptre was built especially for the 1958 America's Cup challenge.

Career
Sceptre was owned by a syndicate headed by Hugh Goodson, plus Richard Dickson, William H. Northam, William G. Walkley, and Noel Foley. Sceptre lost 4-0 to defender Columbia of the New York Yacht Club.  She is now owned and sailed in British waters by the Sceptre Preservation Society.

References
Alexander Robertson & Sons, history of the yard.

External links
 Sceptre Preservation Society

America's Cup challengers
Individual sailing vessels
12-metre class yachts
1950s sailing yachts
Sailing yachts built in the United Kingdom
Sailing yachts of the United Kingdom